Pittsfield is the largest city and the county seat of Berkshire County, Massachusetts, United States. It is the principal city of the Pittsfield, Massachusetts Metropolitan Statistical Area which encompasses all of Berkshire County. Pittsfield’s population was 43,927 at the 2020 census. Although its population has declined in recent decades, Pittsfield remains the third-largest municipality in Western Massachusetts, behind only Springfield and Chicopee.

In 2017, the Arts Vibrancy Index compiled by the National Center for Arts Research ranked Pittsfield and Berkshire County as the number-one, medium-sized community in the nation for the arts.

History

The Mohicans, an Algonquian people, inhabited Pittsfield and the surrounding area until the early 1700s, when the population was greatly reduced by war and disease, and many migrated westward or lived quietly on the fringes of society.

In 1738, a wealthy Bostonian named Col. Jacob Wendell bought  of land known originally as "Pontoosuck", from a Mohican word meaning "a field or haven for winter deer", as a speculative investment. He planned to subdivide and resell to others who would settle there. He formed a partnership with Philip Livingston, a wealthy kinsman from Albany, New York, and Col. John Stoddard of Northampton, who had claim to  here.

A group of young men came and began to clear the land in 1743, but the threat of Indian raids around the time of King George's War soon forced them to leave, and the land remained unoccupied by Englishmen for several more years.

Soon, many others arrived from Westfield, Massachusetts, and a village began to grow, which was incorporated as Pontoosuck Plantation in 1753 by Solomon Deming, Simeon Crofoot, Stephen Crofoot, Charles Goodrich, Jacob Ensign, Samuel Taylor, and Elias Woodward. Mrs. Deming was the first and the last of the original settlers, dying in March 1818 at the age of 92. Solomon Deming died in 1815 at the age of 96.

Pittsfield was incorporated in 1761. Royal Governor Sir Francis Bernard named Pittsfield after British nobleman and politician William Pitt. By 1761 there were 200 residents and the plantation became the Township of Pittsfield.

By the end of the Revolutionary War, Pittsfield had grown to nearly 2,000 residents, including Colonel John Brown, who in 1776 began accusing Benedict Arnold of being a traitor, several years before Arnold defected to the British. Brown wrote in his winter 1776-77 handbill, "Money is this man's God, and to get enough of it he would sacrifice his country."

Pittsfield was primarily an agricultural area because of the many brooks that flowed into the Housatonic River; the landscape was dotted with mills that produced lumber, grist, paper, and textiles. With the introduction of Merino sheep from Spain in 1807, the area became the center of woolen manufacturing in the United States, an industry that would dominate the community's economy for almost a century.

The town was a bustling metropolis by the late 19th century. In 1891, the City of Pittsfield was incorporated and William Stanley Jr., who had recently relocated his Electric Manufacturing Company to Pittsfield from Great Barrington, produced the first electric transformer. Stanley's enterprise was the forerunner of the internationally known corporate giant, General Electric (GE). Thanks to the success of GE, Pittsfield's population in 1930 had grown to more than 50,000. While GE Advanced Materials (now owned by SABIC-Innovative Plastics, a subsidiary of the Riyadh-based Saudi Basic Industries Corporation) continues to be one of the city's largest employers, a workforce that once topped 13,000 was reduced to less than 700 with the demise and/or relocation of General Electric's transformer and aerospace portions. On October 8, 2015, SABIC announced it would relocate its headquarters from Pittsfield to Houston, Texas.

General Dynamics occupies many of the old GE buildings and its workforce is expanding. Much of General Dynamics' local success is based on the awarding of government contracts related to its advanced information systems. In September 2018, Massachusetts Governor Charlie Baker, Massachusetts Lieutenant Governor Karyn Polito, and other Baker administration officials attended the groundbreaking of a $13.7 million project to build a life sciences and advanced manufacturing center in the city.

1902 presidential incident

On September 3, 1902, at 10:15 am, during a two-week tour through New England campaigning for Republican congressmen, the barouche transporting President Theodore Roosevelt from downtown Pittsfield to the Pittsfield Country Club collided head-on with a trolley. Roosevelt, Massachusetts Governor Winthrop Murray Crane, secretary to the president George Bruce Cortelyou, and bodyguard William Craig were thrown into the street. Craig was killed; he was the first Secret Service agent killed while on a presidential protection detail. Roosevelt, whose face and left shin were badly bruised, nearly came to blows with the trolley motorman, Euclid Madden. Madden was later charged with manslaughter, to which he pleaded guilty. He was sentenced to six months in jail and a heavy fine.

Baseball in Pittsfield

In 2004, historian John Thorn discovered a reference to a 1791 by-law prohibiting anyone from playing "baseball" within  of the new meeting house in Pittsfield. A reference librarian, AnnMarie Harris, found the actual by-law in the Berkshire Athenaeum library and its age was verified by researchers at the Williamstown Art Conservation Center. If authentic and if actually referring to a recognizable version of the modern game, the 1791 document, would be, as of 2004, the earliest known reference to the game in America. (See Origins of baseball.) The document is available on the Pittsfield Library's web site.

A finding that baseball was invented in 1839 by Abner Doubleday in Cooperstown, New York, provided the rationale for baseball centennial celebrations in 1939 including the opening of a National Baseball Hall of Fame and Museum in that city. Few historians ever believed it and even the Hall's vice president, Jeff Idelson, has stated that "Baseball wasn't really born anywhere."

In 1859, the first intercollegiate baseball game was played in Pittsfield. Amherst defeated Williams College, 73–32.

Ulysses Frank Grant, born August 1, 1865, in Pittsfield (died May 27, 1937), was an African American baseball player in the 19th century who played in the International League and for various independent teams.

Professional baseball was played in Pittsfield's Wahconah Park from 1894 through 2003. Teams included the early Pittsfield Colts and Pittsfield Hillies, the Pittsfield Electrics of the 1940s, the Pittsfield Red Sox from 1965 to 1969 with such then A-league players and future major leaguers as George Scott, Carlton Fisk, and Reggie Smith, the Pittsfield Senators (later Rangers) of the 1970s, and the 1985–1988 AA Pittsfield Cubs featuring future stars Mark Grace and Rafael Palmeiro. From 1989 to 2001, the Pittsfield Mets and Pittsfield Astros (2001 only) represented the city in the New York–Penn League. The Astros have since moved to Troy, New York, and are now known as the Tri-City ValleyCats.

In 2005, Wahconah Park became the home stadium of the Pittsfield Dukes, a summer collegiate baseball franchise of the New England Collegiate Baseball League owned by Dan Duquette, former Boston Red Sox general manager. The Dukes had played the 2004 season in Hinsdale, Massachusetts, as the Berkshire Dukes. In 2009, the franchise changed its name to the Pittsfield American Defenders. The American Defenders' name refers to both the United States military and a line of baseball gloves produced by Nocona Athletic Goods Company. Duquette's ownership group also owned the American Defenders of New Hampshire, members of the independent Can-Am League.

Since 2012, Wahconah Park has been the home of the Pittsfield Suns of the Futures Collegiate Baseball League.

Mark Belanger, eight-time Gold Glove winning shortstop for the Baltimore Orioles, Turk Wendell, relief pitcher for the New York Mets, and Tom Grieve, outfielder for the Texas Rangers, were all from Pittsfield.

Geography
Pittsfield is at  (42.4522, −73.2515).

Pittsfield is bordered by Lanesborough to the north, Dalton to the east, Washington to the southeast, Lenox to the south, Richmond to the southwest, and Hancock to the west.

Most of the population occupies roughly one-quarter of the city's land. Pittsfield lies at the confluence of the east and west branches of the Housatonic River, which flows south from the city towards its mouth at Long Island Sound, some  distant. The eastern branch leads down from the hills, while the western branch is fed from Onota Lake and Pontoosuc Lake (which lies partly in Lanesborough). Like much of western Berkshire County, the city lies between the Berkshire Hills to the east and the Taconic Range to the west. Sections of the Housatonic Valley Wildlife Management Area dot the banks of the river. The western portion of the city contains Pittsfield State Forest, an  facility with hiking and cross-country skiing trails, camping, picnic areas, and a beach for swimming.

Pittsfield is at the crossroads of U.S. Route 7 and U.S. Route 20, which join together in the city. Massachusetts Route 8 passes through the northeast corner of town, with a portion of it combined with Route 9, the central east-west road through the western part of the state, whose western terminus is in the city at Route 20. Route 41 begins in the southwest corner of town, heading south from Route 20.

Long-distance ground transportation in Pittsfield is based at the Joseph Scelsi Intermodal Transportation Center, which serves as the station for Amtrak trains and Peter Pan buses. The Berkshire Regional Transit Authority, the transit provider for Pittsfield and vicinity, is based at the Intermodal Center and also uses it as a hub for most of its lines. Rail freight transportation is provided by CSX Transportation and the Housatonic Railroad.

The fixed-base operator at Pittsfield Municipal Airport offers access to the region via private and chartered aircraft ranging from single-engined piston to multiple-engined jet planes. They also offer scenic rides and flight training. The nearest airport with national service is Albany International Airport.

Climate
Pittsfield has a humid continental climate (Dfb). Summers, however, are typically warm and pleasant, with temperatures reaching  just six times per year. Over the course of a year, 173 days have measurable precipitation.

Housatonic River

Background and historical overview
Flowing through a historically rural area, the Housatonic River attracted increased industrialization in the late 19th century. William Stanley, Jr., founded the Stanley Electric Manufacturing Company in 1890 at Pittsfield. The company manufactured small transformers, electrical motors and appliances. In 1903, GE acquired Stanley Electric and subsequently operated three major manufacturing operations in Pittsfield: transformer, ordnance, and plastics.

Environmental issues
During the mid-20th century, the Housatonic River and its floodplain were contaminated with polychlorinated biphenyls (PCBs) and other hazardous substances released from the General Electric Company (GE) facility in Pittsfield. The contaminated area, known as the General Electric/Housatonic River Site, includes the GE manufacturing facility; the Housatonic River, its riverbanks and floodplains from Pittsfield to Long Island Sound, and former river oxbows that have been filled; Allendale School; Silver Lake; and other areas contaminated as a result of GE's operations in Pittsfield.

The highest concentrations of PCBs in the Housatonic River are found from the site of the GE plant in Pittsfield to Woods Pond in Lenox, Massachusetts, where they have been measured up to 140 mg/kg (140 ppm). About 50% of all the PCBs in the river are estimated to be retained in the sediment behind Woods Pond dam. This is estimated to be about 11,000 pounds of PCBs. Birds and fish who live in and around the river contain significant levels of PCBs.

Consent decree and cleanup

Starting in 1991, legal proceedings by the U.S. Environmental Protection Agency (EPA) established the General Electric/Housatonic River Site. Initial cleanup work began in 1996 when EPA issued a unilateral order to GE that required the removal of highly contaminated sediments and bank soils. EPA added the site to the Superfund list in September 1997.

The year 1999 was a milestone for Pittsfield, when negotiations between EPA, the state, General Electric and the City resulted in a settlement agreement, valued at over $250 million, to clean up Pittsfield and the Housatonic River. The settlement was memorialized in a consent decree entered in federal court the following year, making it a binding legal agreement.

Cleanup of the polluted downstream river areas has not been completed as of 2020. In February 2020 EPA announced a settlement agreement involving GE, EPA and most of the concerned parties, to remove contaminated sediment from the areas south of Pittsfield. Highly contaminated soil would be removed and shipped to federally-approved facilities outside the state, while less-contaminated soil would be placed in a new specially-designed landfill in Berkshire County. EPA's plan is subject to public comment and is expected to be finalized later in 2020.

Groundwater and long-term monitoring
In the years since the settlement was reached, the EPA, state agencies, the City and GE accomplished one of the largest and most complex cleanups in the country. Cleanup work on the first previously PCB-laden half mile of the Housatonic River, adjacent to the GE facility, was completed in September 2002. $90 million was spent cleaning up the  reach between Lyman Street and Fred Garner Park, which was completed in June 2007. Biological and sediment samples showed reductions of approximately 99% of PCB concentrations compared to conditions before remediation. GE removed contaminated soil and restored 27 residential properties abutting the river. As of 2019 GE has completed remediation and restoration of the 10 manufacturing plant areas within the city, and is conducting inspection, monitoring and maintenance activities.

Demographics

As of the census of 2000, there were 45,793 people, 19,704 households, and 11,822 families residing in the city. Pittsfield is the largest city by population in Berkshire County, and ranks 27th out of the 351 cities and towns in Massachusetts.

The racial makeup of the city in 2017 was 87.4% white (84.4% non-Hispanic white), 4.7% black, 0.4% Native American, 2.0% Asian (0.6% Chinese, 0.5% Indian, 0.3% Pakistani, 0.2% Filipino, 0.2% Korean, 0.1% Vietnamese), 0.02% Pacific Islander, 2.0% from other races, and 3.5% from two or more races. Hispanics and Latinos of any race were 6.0% of the population (1.9% Puerto Rican, 0.9% Mexican, 0.6% Ecuadorian, 0.5% Dominican, 0.4% Spanish, 0.3% Peruvian, 0.3% Honduran, 0.2% Colombian, 0.2% Salvadoran, 0.1% Cuban). The ten largest ancestry groups in the city were Irish (22.5%), Italian (17.5%), French (11.7%), German (9.9%), English (8.6%), Polish (6.7%), American (4.1%), French-Canadian (3.7%), Scottish (1.7%), and Russian (1.5%). Immigrants accounted for 7.3% of the population. The ten most common countries of origin for immigrants in the city were Puerto Rico, Ecuador, China, Mexico, the Dominican Republic, India, El Salvador, Canada, Ghana, and Brazil.

In 2010, there were 19,704 households, out of which 27.3% had children under the age of 18 living with them, 42.9% were married couples living together, 13.1% had a female householder with no husband present, and 40.0% were non-families. 34.0% of all households were made up of individuals, and 14.3% had someone living alone who was 65 years of age or older. The average household size was 2.26 and the average family size was 2.89.

In 2010 in the city, the population was spread out, with 23.2% under the age of 18, 6.9% from 18 to 24, 28.3% from 25 to 44, 23.0% from 45 to 64, and 18.6% who were 65 years of age or older. The median age was 40 years. For every 100 females, there were 90.6 males. For every 100 females age 18 and over, there were 86.2 males.

The median income for a household in the city in 2010 was $35,655, and the median income for a family was $46,228. Males had a median income of $35,538 versus $26,341 for females. The per capita income for the city was $20,549. About 8.9% of families and 11.4% of the population were below the poverty line, including 16.7% of those under age 18 and 7.1% of those age 65 or over.

Government

Pittsfield employs the mayor-council form of government. The mayor is Linda Tyer, who was elected for Pittsfield's first four-year term in January 2016, succeeding Daniel Bianchi, who served the city since January 2012. The city is fully functioning, with all the major public services, including Berkshire Medical Center which is the only hospital in the northern part of the county, and the region's only VA medical clinic. The city's library, the Berkshire Athenaeum, is one of the largest in western Massachusetts, and is connected to the regional library system. Pittsfield is also the county seat of Berkshire County, and as such has many state facilities for the county. In 2011, the City of Pittsfield received 129 designs of prospective official flags from residents in honor of the 250th anniversary of Pittsfield's incorporation as a town, with the winning design submitted by Shaun Harris.

On the state level, Pittsfield has two elected representatives to the Massachusetts House of Representatives: the Third Berkshire District, which covers most of the city proper and is represented by Tricia Farley-Bouvier and the Second Berkshire District, which serves portions of Berkshire County as well as portions of Hampshire County and Franklin County, represented by Paul Mark. In the Massachusetts Senate, the city is represented by Adam G. Hinds of the Berkshire, Hampshire, Franklin and Hampden district. The city is patrolled by the Fourth (Cheshire) Station of Barracks "B" of the Massachusetts State Police.

On the national level, Pittsfield is represented in the United States House of Representatives as part of Massachusetts's 1st congressional district, and has been represented by Richard Neal (D) of Springfield since 2013. Massachusetts is represented in the United States Senate by senior Senator Elizabeth Warren (D) and junior Senator Ed Markey (D).

Education

Pittsfield operates a public school system which has more than 6,000 students. There are eight elementary schools (Allendale, Robert T. Capeless, Crosby, Egremont, Morningside, Silvio O. Conte, Stearns and Williams), two middle schools (Theodore Herberg and John T. Reid), two high schools (Pittsfield High School and Taconic High School), and one private school (Miss Hall's School). The high schools both offer internal vocational programs. Students also come to the high schools from neighboring Richmond. There were two parochial schools open for many decades, but both recently closed (Saint Mark's for elementary and middle school students, and St. Joseph Central High School for high school students).

Pittsfield is the home to the main campus of Berkshire Community College and Mildred Elley's Pittsfield campus. The nearest state college is the Massachusetts College of Liberal Arts in North Adams, and the nearest state university is Westfield State University. The nearest private colleges are Williams College in Williamstown and Bard College at Simon's Rock in Great Barrington. In addition, the Berkshire Music School, a non-profit music school, offers private and group lessons in multiple instruments.

Points of interest

Culture

Pittsfield is the geographic and commercial hub of the Berkshires—a historic area that includes Tanglewood, the summer home of the Boston Symphony Orchestra, and author Edith Wharton's estate The Mount. Many buildings in Pittsfield are listed on the National Register of Historic Places.

Downtown Pittsfield is home to the gilded-age Colonial Theatre, the Berkshire Museum, the Beacon Cinema (multi-plex), the Barrington Stage Company, Berkshire Athenaeum, Wahconah Park and Hebert Arboretum. In recent years, the city has undergone a transformation with significant investment in the historic downtown, including a variety of new restaurants (French, Asian, Latin American, etc.), condominium and other residential developments and cultural attractions.

The Colonial Theatre, dating from 1903, was named by Hillary Clinton as a National Historic Treasure in 1998. The community invested more than $22 million to refurbish the 100-year-old Colonial Theatre, one of the only theaters of its kind from the Vaudeville age. The venue has been described as the "one of the finest acoustical theaters in the world."

Barrington Stage Company, the Tony Award-winning producer of The 25th Annual Putnam County Spelling Bee invested millions into its newly renovated stage in downtown Pittsfield, along with the development of other stages within the downtown for smaller performances. Barrington Stage's head of its Musical Theatre Lab, William Finn, told the Boston Globe that he was determined to make Pittsfield the "epicenter of the musical theater universe."

The Berkshire Museum, the oldest and most diverse museum in the Berkshires, has undergone a multi-million dollar renovation that incorporated a state-of-the-art air control system that will allow it to attract world-class exhibits.

Many of the Berkshires' oldest homes, dating to the mid-18th century, can be found in Pittsfield, as well as many historic neighborhoods dating from the late 19th century and early 20th century.

Several small multi-generational farms can still be found in Pittsfield, though suburban sprawl and land development have recently claimed some of this land.

Numerous old churches dot the landscape, and are architectural marvels to behold. Some are closed down or resold as homes or for other usages, and yet some newer churches remain. Many of these older churches are Catholic, like St. Joseph's, or Sacred Heart church that is actually bright pink.

Additional cultural attractions include:

 Arrowhead, home of author Herman Melville (1850–1863). It was here that Melville wrote Moby Dick.
 Silvio O. Conte National Archives and Records Administration.

Recreation

Pittsfield has several country clubs, including the Pontoosuc Lake Country Club. Pittsfield is home to two major lakes, Onota and Pontoosuc, both used for swimming, boating, and fishing. The Berkshire Rowing and Sculling Society is on Onota Lake.

Pittsfield is home to Canoe Meadows Wildlife Sanctuary,  of woods, fields, and wetlands maintained by the Massachusetts Audubon Society. Bousquet Ski Area and Summer Resort entertains visitors and residents year-round with skiing, water slides, go-karts, and other fun activities.

Pittsfield State Forest, an  park, provides residents and tourists with hiking and cross-country skiing trails, camping, picnic areas, and a swimming beach. The highest body of water in Massachusetts, Berry Pond, is at the top of the Pittsfield State Forest just outside the city limits in the town of Hancock.

The Berkshire Bike Path Council is working with the City of Pittsfield and local residents to extend the Ashuwillticook Rail Trail, a  paved trail just north of Pittsfield. The extension would pass through Pittsfield and lead south to Lenox and Great Barrington.

Transportation

Downtown Pittsfield serves as the crossroads of two US Highways: US 7 & US 20.

Pittsfield is served by Amtrak's Lake Shore Limited from Chicago to Boston from the Joseph Scelsi Intermodal Transportation Center.

Local transit is provided by the Berkshire Regional Transit Authority.

Media

Newspapers
 The Berkshire Eagle, the main daily newspaper for the Pittsfield area
 The Advocate, a weekly newspaper devoted to the Berkshires and nearby Bennington County
 Hill Country Observer, a monthly newspaper covering an eight-county region of western Massachusetts, southern Vermont and eastern New York
 The Berkshire Record, a weekly newspaper
 iBerkshires.com, an online newspaper
 theberkshireedge.com, an online newspaper

Television
Pittsfield is in the Albany television market and is the community of license for two stations in that market, MyNetworkTV affiliate WNYA, and a low power TV station, W28DA, which rebroadcasts sister station and NBC affiliate WNYT on channel 13 from a location on South Mountain in the city. Springfield stations also serve the market with three stations (NBC affiliate WWLP, low-powered CBS affiliate WSHM-LD, and PBS member station WGBY-TV) on cable. WGGB-TV, Springfield's ABC affiliate, has never been carried on the cable system in Pittsfield, but is viewable over the air in some sections. Also carried on cable, but not necessarily serving Pittsfield, is Boston's WCVB (the ABC affiliate in that area).

Cable television subscribers of Charter Spectrum in Pittsfield receive public, educational, and government access (PEG) channels, provided by Pittsfield Community Television (PCTV), on channels 1301, 1302 and 1303: 
Access Pittsfield, channel 1301, Public-access television
Pittsfield ETV, channel 1302, Education-access television
Citylink, channel 1303, Government-access television (GATV)

Pittsfield Community Television is a not-for-profit, 501 (c)(3) organization and a member of the Alliance for Community Media. Programming on PCTV is available 24 hours per day, year-long, and is available online.

Radio
Pittsfield is home to the following radio stations:
1110 kHz WUPE (Oldies, simulcast of WUPE-FM)
1340 kHz WBRK (Adult Standards)
1420 kHz WBEC (Talk)
89.7 MHz WTBR-FM (Rock)
95.9 MHz WBEC-FM (Top 40, Tower on Bosquet Mountain)
101.7 MHz WBRK-FM (AC)
104.3 MHz WRRS-LP (Radio Reading Service)
106.1 MHz W291CH (Simulcast of WFCR, Western Massachusetts NPR affiliate out of Amherst)

Signals from North Adams, Great Barrington, and Springfield, Massachusetts, as well as from Albany, New York, also reach Pittsfield. In some areas signals from cities well outside of Pittsfield, like Boston and Hartford, Connecticut, will be received, depending on the location.

One of Pittsfield's oldest radio stations, WBEC-FM 105.5, was sold and relocated to Mount Tom in Holyoke, where it became a Springfield area radio station (licensed to Easthampton).

Business
Pittsfield is home to several businesses, including:
SABIC-Innovative Plastics (formerly known as General Electric (Plastics/Advanced Materials Division) and now a subsidiary of the Riyadh-based Saudi Basic Industries Corporation)
General Dynamics Mission Systems (Pittsfield facility originally known as General Electric Ordnance)
Interprint Incorporated on the Pittsfield-Richmond line
The Moscow Ballet, national touring dance company and producer of the Great Russian Nutcracker
Pittsfield Generating Facility, natural gas fired generating station
The Berkshire Humane Society operates animal welfare services and pet adoption facilities in Pittsfield

Notable people

 Thomas Allen, railroad builder and member of United States Congress
 William Allen, compiler of first work of general biography published in United States
 Edward Deming Andrews, historian, author, and authority on the Shakers
 Elizabeth Banks, actress in films including Seabiscuit, Spider-Man, The 40-Year-Old Virgin, W., The Hunger Games and The Lego Movie; and current host of Press Your Luck
 William Francis Bartlett, Civil War general
 Mark Belanger, former Gold Glove shortstop for Baltimore Orioles, 1970 World Series champion
 Matt Belknap, founder of A Special Thing comedy record label, producer and co-host of comedy podcast Never Not Funny
 Chuck Berkeley, 2010 Olympian in bobsled
 Michael Boroniec, sculptor and painter
Lawrence Bossidy, former CEO of Honeywell
 Henry Shaw Briggs, brigadier general during American Civil War
 Roger E. Broggie, Disney Legend Award recipient (1990), selected by Walt Disney as first Imagineer, team that created Disneyland, Walt Disney World and similar themed amusement parks
 Colonel John Brown, Revolutionary War patriot, first to accuse Benedict Arnold
 Timothy Childs, congressman
 Silvio O. Conte, congressman
 Elizabeth Sprague Coolidge, philanthropist and music patron, founded Berkshire Music Festival at South Mountain in 1918
 Art Ditmar, 1950s pitcher for Philadelphia and Kansas City Athletics and New York Yankees
 Michael Downing (writer) author of book Breakfast with Scot
 J. Allan Dunn, prolific author for pulp magazines
 Pat Fallon, member of the U.S. House, former member of the Texas Senate and Texas House of Representatives
 Cy Ferry, baseball player for Detroit Tigers and Cleveland Naps in early years of American League
 Jack Ferry, baseball player for Pittsburgh Pirates in 1910s
 Marshall Field, founded Chicago's Marshall Field's department stores, took first job in 1853 as a clerk in Pittsfield; white terra-cotta Pittsfield Building in downtown Chicago is so named because of Field's connection to Pittsfield
 Daniel Fox, shares credit for invention of Lexan plastic
 Peter Francese, speaker and writer
 Marc Gafni, American author and former rabbi, New Age spiritual teacher
 Elaine Giftos, actress
 Frank Grant, 19th Century African American baseball player
 Nancy Graves, sculptor and painter
 Tom Grieve, player, general manager and broadcaster for Major League Baseball's Texas Rangers
 Gene Hermanski, baseball player, Brooklyn Dodgers, Chicago Cubs, Pittsburgh Pirates
 Oliver Wendell Holmes, Sr., poet, summered in Pittsfield; mother's family owned  in Pittsfield
 Hung Huynh, winner of reality television show Top Chef Season 3, graduate of Pittsfield High School
 Donald Kaufman, co-founder of KB Toys and antique toy collector
 Henry Wadsworth Longfellow, poet, educator, linguist, owned home on East Street, now site of Pittsfield High School (see photos above)
 Jay McInerney, novelist, author of Bright Lights, Big City (1984) on which film was based
James Melcher (born 1939), Olympic fencer and hedge fund manager
 Herman Melville, author, resided at Arrowhead in Pittsfield, where he wrote his most famous novel, Moby-Dick and several others. Visitors can see the peaks of Mount Greylock through the study-window, peaks which reminded Melville of a whale's back. Nathaniel Hawthorne wrote "On the hither side of Pittsfield sits Herman Melville, shaping out the gigantic conception of his 'White Whale,' while the gigantic shape of Graylock looms upon him from his study-window."
 William Miller, 19th Century preacher
 Sarah Morewood, literary figure in the Berkshires and intimate friend of Herman Melville. Her farm adjoined Arrowhead (Herman Melville House), and is now the site of the Country Club of Pittsfield
 Elaine Cancilla Orbach, Broadway actress, actor Jerry Orbach's widow
 Chad Paronto, Major League Baseball relief pitcher
 Edward Partridge, first bishop of the Church of Jesus Christ of Latter-day Saints
 Adrian Pasdar, actor
 Brian Piccolo, Chicago Bears halfback, subject of movie Brian's Song
 Robert Prentiss, Massachusetts and New York politician
 Emily Robison, musician and member of the Dixie Chicks
 John James Rudin, Roman Catholic bishop
 Richard Salwitz, musician with J Geils Band
 Niraj Shah (born 1973/74), billionaire CEO and co-founder of Wayfair
 William Stanley, Jr., invented first alternating current electrical transformer
 Charles Thomas Stearns, member of Minnesota Territorial Legislature
 Howie Storie, catcher for Boston Red Sox during early 1930s
 John Szarkowski, photographer, critic, historian, curator of photography at MoMA
 James Walter Thompson, 19th Century advertising pioneer
 Bruce Tulgan, author of Managing Generation X and It's Okay To Be the Boss
 Elkanah Watson, author and agriculturist, in 1810 held the first county fair in the country in Pittsfield
 Jack Welch, former CEO of General Electric
 Turk Wendell, MLB Pitcher
 Paul Weston, musician, composer and arranger, was raised in Pittsfield. 
 David Dunnels White, soldier of 37th Massachusetts Regiment, organized in Pittsfield during Civil War, captured Confederate Major General George Washington Custis Lee, son of famed General Robert E. Lee, during Battle of Sailor's Creek Virginia, April 6, 1865
 Charles White Whittlesey, Army officer and Medal of Honor recipient who led "Lost Battalion" in Meuse-Argonne Offensive in October 1918 during final stages of World War I
 Robin Williams, actor, maintained a summer home in Pittsfield
 Stephanie Wilson, astronaut
 Walter Zink, was a professional baseball pitcher who played for the New York Giants

See also
List of mayors of Pittsfield, Massachusetts
 List of mill towns in Massachusetts

References

External links

 City of Pittsfield official website
 Pittsfield stakes its claim in baseball history, by Adam Gorlick, Associated Press, May 11, 2004, retrieved on 2009-10-16
 History of Pittsfield 1800–1876
 Pittsfield History, Old Newspaper Articles, Genealogy
 The History of Pittsfield, Massachusetts, from the Year 1876 to the Year 1916
 

 
Cities in Massachusetts
Cities in Berkshire County, Massachusetts
History of baseball in the United States
County seats in Massachusetts
Populated places established in 1752